Jeremiah McGuire (1823 in Isle of Man – October 25, 1889 in Elmira, Chemung County, New York) was an American lawyer and politician.

He came to the United States in 1830. He worked for some time on a farm in Hector, Schuyler County, New York before he started to study the law with H. B. Jackson in Havana, Schuyler County, New York.

As a Democrat, he was a member of the New York State Assembly in 1873 (Schuyler Co.); and in 1875 (Chemung Co.); and was elected Speaker in 1875.  He ran for Congress in 1886, but was beaten by T. S. Flood.

Sources
Obit in NYT October 26, 1889

1823 births
1889 deaths
Speakers of the New York State Assembly
Manx emigrants to the United States
People from Schuyler County, New York
Politicians from Elmira, New York
19th-century American politicians